Tierna Lillis Davidson (born September 19, 1998) is an American soccer player for the Chicago Red Stars of the National Women's Soccer League (NWSL), the highest division of women's professional soccer in the United States, and the United States national team. She was drafted first overall by the Chicago Red Stars in the 2019 NWSL College Draft after playing three years at Stanford.

Early life
Davidson intended to become an astronaut, before actively pursuing professional soccer.

Stanford University, 2016–2018
In Davidson's freshman year in 2016 she started all 21 games for the Cardinal, and was named to the Pac-12 All Freshman team and the All-Pac-12 Second Team. In 2017, Davidson was named Pac-12 Defensive Player of the Year. She was a key part of the Stanford team that won the 2017 NCAA Division I Women's Soccer Tournament and was named the 2017 College Cup Most Outstanding Defensive Player. In 2018 Davidson only appeared in 3 games for Stanford as she suffered a fractured ankle on September 9 against North Carolina. This would be her final appearance for Stanford as she declared for the 2019 NWSL College Draft, forgoing her final year of college eligibility.

Club career

Chicago Red Stars, 2019–present
In November 2018, the National Women's Soccer League changed their rules for the NWSL College Draft to allow for players to enter the draft before they had exhausted their college eligibility. This allowed Davidson to declare for the 2019 NWSL College Draft after only playing three years at Stanford. Davidson was selected 1st overall at the draft by the Chicago Red Stars, she was the second consecutive Cardinal to be selected 1st overall after Andi Sullivan was the 1st overall pick in 2018.

On March 11, 2019 Davidson signed a contract with the Red Stars.

Davidson was injured in March 2022, suffering an ACL injury, missing the remainder of the 2022 NWSL season.

International career
In 2018 Davidson played for the senior USWNT and the U-20 WNT. She received her first senior cap for the United States on January 21, 2018 in a friendly against Denmark. After the match she joined the U-20 squad in Trinidad & Tobago for the 2018 CONCACAF U-20 Championship. Davidson scored the tying goal in the Championship game against Mexico, but the United States would lose on penalty kicks.

Davidson was not part to the final roster for the 2018 FIFA U-20 World Cup as she has continued to receive call-ups for the senior USWNT. On July 18 she was named to the USWNT roster for the 2018 Tournament of Nations.

Davidson scored her 1st international goal on August 31, 2018 against Chile.
Davidson was not part of the 2018 CONCACAF Championship due to a fractured ankle injury while playing for Stanford. In December, Davidson was named 2018 U.S. Soccer Young Female Player of the Year.

After recovering from injury Davidson returned to the USWNT in January 2019 and was named to the roster for the 2019 SheBelieves Cup in February.

In May 2019, Davidson was named to the final 23-player squad for the 2019 FIFA World Cup, the youngest player on the roster.

In June 2021, Davidson was named to the 18-player squad for the 2020 Summer Olympics held in Tokyo.

International goals

World Cup appearances

Olympic appearances

Personal life
Davidson is openly queer.

Honors
Stanford
 2017 NCAA Division I Women's Soccer Tournament

United States
 FIFA Women's World Cup: 2019
 Olympic Bronze Medal: 2020
 SheBelieves Cup: 2018; 2020; 2021; 2022
 Tournament of Nations: 2018

Individual
 U.S. Soccer Young Female Player of the Year: 2018

References

External links
Stanford profile
 
 Tierna Davidson USWNT profile

1998 births
Living people
American women's soccer players
United States women's international soccer players
Stanford Cardinal women's soccer players
United States women's under-20 international soccer players
People from Menlo Park, California
Soccer players from California
Sportspeople from the San Francisco Bay Area
Women's association football defenders
Chicago Red Stars draft picks
2019 FIFA Women's World Cup players
National Women's Soccer League players
Chicago Red Stars players
Lesbian sportswomen
LGBT association football players
American LGBT sportspeople
LGBT people from California
FIFA Women's World Cup-winning players
Footballers at the 2020 Summer Olympics
Olympic bronze medalists for the United States in soccer
Medalists at the 2020 Summer Olympics
American soccer players
Association football defenders